Esbank or Eskişehir Bank was a former Turkish bank.

The bank was founded on 15 September 1927 as a local bank in Eskişehir, Turkey . Its founding capital was TL 500000. Up to 1955, it was a single-office bank serving only in Eskişehir. After 1955 with a number of branch offices it became a regional bank. After 1980 it became a national bank. Towards the end of 1990s the number of branch offices raised to 91. However in 2001, it was merged to Etibank.

References

Banks established in 1927
Banks disestablished in 2001
Defunct banks of Turkey
Companies based in Eskişehir